Francis Cornish may refer to:

Francis Cornish (diplomat) (born 1942), British diplomat
Francis Evans Cornish (1831–1878), Canadian politician
The protagonist of Robertson Davies’ 1985 novel What's Bred in the Bone

See also
Francis Warre-Cornish (1839–1916), British scholar and writer
Frank Cornish (1967–2008), American football player
Frank Cornish Jr. (born 1944), American football player